Euprymna phenax is a species of bobtail squid native to the waters of the Indo-Pacific, off the Philippines and possibly in the East China Sea. The depth range of this species is unknown. It was originally collected at nightlight.

The type specimen is 11 mm in mantle length.

The type specimen was collected off the Philippines and is deposited at the National Museum of Natural History in Washington, D.C.

References

External links

Bobtail squid
Molluscs described in 1962